A butcher is a person who may slaughter animals, dress their flesh, sell their meat, or participate within any combination of these three tasks. They may prepare standard cuts of meat and poultry for sale in retail or wholesale food establishments. A butcher may be employed by supermarkets, grocery stores, butcher shops and fish markets, slaughter houses, or may be self-employed.

Butchery is an ancient trade, whose duties may date back to the domestication of livestock; its practitioners formed guilds in England as far back as 1272. Since the 20th century, many countries and local jurisdictions offer trade certifications for butchers in order to ensure quality, safety, and health standards but not all butchers have formal certification or training. Trade qualification in English-speaking countries is often earned through an apprenticeship although some training organisations also certify their students. In Canada, once a butcher is trade qualified, they can learn to become a master butcher (Fleishmaster).

Standards and practices of butchery differ between countries, regions and ethnic groups. Variation with respect to the types of animals that are butchered as well as the cuts and parts of the animal that are sold depends on the types of foods that are prepared by the butcher's customers.

Duties

Butchery is a traditional line of work. In the industrialized world, slaughterhouses  use butchers to slaughter the animals, performing one or a few of the steps repeatedly as specialists on a semi automated disassembly line. The steps include stunning (rendering the animal incapacitated), exsanguination (severing the carotid or brachial arteries to facilitate blood removal), skinning (removing the hide or pelt) or scalding and dehairing (pork), evisceration (removing the viscera) and splitting (dividing the carcass in half longitudinally).

After the carcasses are chilled (unless "hot-boned"), primary butchery consists of selecting carcasses, sides, or quarters from which primal cuts can be produced with the minimum of wastage; separating the primal cuts from the carcass; trimming primal cuts and preparing them for secondary butchery or sale; and storing cut meats. Secondary butchery involves boning, trimming and value-adding of primal cuts, in preparation for sale. Historically, primary and secondary butchery were performed in the same establishment, but the advent of methods of preservation (vacuum packing) and low cost transportation has largely separated them.

In parts of the world, it is common for butchers to perform many or all of the butcher's duties. Where refrigeration is less common, these skills are required to sell the meat of slaughtered animals.

Butcher shop

Butchers sell their goods in specialized stores, commonly termed a butcher shop (American English), butchery (South African English) or butcher's shop (British English). Butchers at a butcher shop may perform primary butchery, but will typically perform secondary butchery to prepare fresh cuts of meat for sale. These shops may also sell related products, such as Charcuterie, hot food (using their own meat products), food preparation supplies, baked goods and grocery items. Butcher shops can have a wider variety of animal types, meat cuts and quality of cuts. Additionally, butcher shops may focus on a particular culture, or nationality, of meat production. Some butcher shops, termed "meat delis", may also include a delicatessen.

In the United States and Canada, butcher shops have become less common because of the increasing popularity of supermarkets and warehouse clubs. Many remaining ones are aimed at Hispanic and other immigrants or, more recently, those looking for organic offerings. Supermarkets employ butchers for secondary butchery, but in the United States even that role is diminished with the advent of "case-ready" meat, where the product is packaged for retail sale at the packinghouse or specialized central processing plants.

Primal cut

A primal cut is a piece of meat initially separated from the carcass during butchering. Different countries and cultures make these cuts in different ways, and primal cuts also differ between type of carcass. The British, American and French primal cuts all differ in some respects. One notable example with pork is fatback, which in Europe is an important primal cut of pork, but in North America is regarded as trimmings to be used in sausage or rendered into lard. The primal cuts may be sold complete or cut further.

Metaphorical use
See also Butcher (disambiguation)
In various periods and cultures, the term "butcher" has been applied to people who act cruelly to other human beings or slaughter them. For example, Pompey, a prominent Roman general and politician of the first century BC, got the Latin nickname adulescentulus carnifex, translated as "The Teenage Butcher" or "The Butcher Boy", due to brutal treatment of political opponents in the early part of his career. The term can also be used in a semi-humorous or metaphorical way to describe someone whose actions resemble the various skills and methods of a butcher (chopping, cutting, slicing, stabbing etc.) Spanish footballer Andoni Goikoetxea was popularly ascribed the epithet "The Butcher of Bilbao" in recognition of his perceived aggressive style of play and frequent, sometimes injurious, challenges on opposing players.

Notable butchers and butcher shops 

 Dario Cecchini
 Lobel's of New York
 Tom Mylan
 Omaha Steaks
 Arthur Orton
 Pat LaFrieda Meat Purveyors
 Salt Bae

See also
 Charcuterie
 Meat cutter
 Meat price
 Qassab
 Qureshi
 Sausage making
 Victualler
Butcher knife
Butcher soup

References

Further reading

 Slovak Pig Slaughter, Butchering, and Traditional Sausage Making - article in English with detailed pictures of Slovak family following traditional procedures

Meat industry
Food services occupations
Culinary terminology
Retailers by type of merchandise sold